= Los Premios 40 Principales América for Best Paraguayan Act =

Premios 40 Principales for Best Paraguayan Act
- Awarded for: Best in Latin American and international music
- Country: Latin America
- Presented by: Los 40 Principales
- First award: 2014

The Premio 40 Principales América for Best Paraguayan Act is an honor presented annually since 2014 as part of Los Premios 40 Principales América.

== Winners and nominees ==
Year	Winner	Nominees
2014	Iván Zavala	Kchiporros; Paiko; Humbertiko & Urbanos; Salamandra
